Pete Wheeler (born 1978 in Geraldine, New Zealand) is a New Zealand artist, currently living and working in Berlin, Germany.

Wheeler lived in Dunedin during the late 1990s and early 2000s, graduating with a BFA from the Otago Polytechnic's School of Fine Art in 2000. He has held 16 solo shows in New Zealand, Australia, America and Europe.

Death, time and the shadow of history are recurring themes in Wheeler's art.

Solo Shows
2000 Emerging Artist 2000, Centre of Contemporary Art, Christchurch, New Zealand
2001 Ill Strokes, High Street Project, Christchurch, New Zealand
2002 Disarticulated 2, Centre of Contemporary Art, Christchurch, New Zealand
2003 The Words of Wisdom are Heard in Quite, Timaru Public Art Gallery, Timaru, New Zealand, and Milford Galleries, Dunedin, New Zealand
2004 We will Shine Like Stars in the Summer Night, The Arthouse, Christchurch, New Zealand
2004 I Went Looking for One Good Man, Whitespace, Auckland, New Zealand
2004 Night of the Long Knives, Milford Galleries, Dunedin, New Zealand
2005 Citizen Artist, The Arthouse Christchurch, New Zealand
2005 Vitamin P, Mark Wolley Gallery, Portland, United States
2006 Don't Believe the Hype, Brooke Gifford Gallery, Christchurch, New Zealand
2006 Home Before Dark, Whitespace, Auckland, New Zealand
2007 History Will be Kind to Me, Brooke Gifford Gallery, Christchurch, New Zealand
2007 Losing the War on Images, Whitespace, Auckland, New Zealand
2007 Run Like Hell, Kolektiv Berlin, Berlin, Germany

References

External links 
 http://www.the-generalstore.net/Pete_Wheeler.php
Art New Zealand article
www.artbash.co.nz
www.artbash.co.nz
New Zealand Herald article
New Zealand Herald article
New Zealand Herald article
New Zealand Listener article
Kolektiv Berlin

1978 births
Living people
Artists from Dunedin
People from Geraldine, New Zealand
Otago Polytechnic alumni
20th-century New Zealand artists
20th-century New Zealand male artists
21st-century New Zealand artists
21st-century New Zealand male artists